Warwick Municipal Airport  is a public use airport located three nautical miles (6 km) northeast of Warwick, a village in the Town of Warwick, Orange County, New York, United States. The airport is owned by the Town of Warwick and has been in operation since 1946. It is included in the National Plan of Integrated Airport Systems for 2011–2015, which categorized it as a general aviation facility.

Facilities and aircraft 
Warwick Municipal Airport covers an area of 133 acres (54 ha) at an elevation of 540 feet (165 m) above mean sea level. It has one asphalt paved runway designated 3R/21L which measures 2,150 by 28 feet (655 x 9 m); it also has two turf runways: 3L/21R is 2,100 by 50 feet (640 x 15 m) and 8/26 is 2,250 by 80 feet (686 x 24 m).

For the 12-month period ending October 6, 2011, the airport had 4,500 general aviation aircraft operations, an average of 12 per day. At that time there were 41 single-engine aircraft based at this airport.

References

External links 
 Airport's website
 Warwick Municipal Airport (N72) at NYSDOT Airport Directory
 Aerial image as of April 1994 from USGS The National Map
 

Airports in New York (state)
Transportation buildings and structures in Orange County, New York
Warwick, New York
Airports established in 1946
1946 establishments in New York (state)